Pivašiūnai is a village in Alytus district municipality, in Alytus County, in southeastern Lithuania. According to the 2021 census, the village has a population of 256 people. 

References

Villages in Varėna District Municipality